The Jidong Nanpu oil field is an oil field located in Bohai Bay, China. It was discovered in 2005 and developed by China National Petroleum Corporation. It began production in 2006 and produces oil.

References

Oil fields in China